Rupeni Caucaunibuca (born 5 June 1980) is a retired Fijian rugby union footballer who last played professionally for Northland in the ITM Cup. His nickname was the "Bua Bullet" as he hailed from the province of Bua.

Early years
Caucaunibuca or "Rups", as called by those who knew him, grew up most of his life in the village. Caucaunibuca's father was a church minister based around the Bua province on the northern parts of Fiji so his family frequently moved.

Caucaunibuca was a keen rugby player in his youth as he began to show his skills, pace and athleticism during the afternoon touch rugby on his village ground.

Caucaunibuca went to Bucalevu, a school in Taveuni after completing his primary education at Kubulau District School in Bua. He took athletics and would often participate in the sprint event. His talent was recognised during secondary school trials at Ratu Sukuna Memorial School grounds. Caucaunibuca went on to represent the Bua Rugby team at the B Division championship but lost to Ovalau in the semi final. Ovalau went on to the premier competition.

Caucaunibuca caught the eye of the Fiji selectors and coach, the late Rupeni Ravonu at one of the local 7's competition in early 2000 and he selected the youngster to his Police team. Caucau excelled from there and later was rewarded and named in the Fiji sevens team, and his first time to travel overseas. Despite only playing in five of the nine tournaments of the 2000–01 World Sevens Series, Caucaunibuca led the Fijian team in points scored (194) and tries scored (38).

He has also been the honourable chairman of Hong Kong Touch Rugby Team Rupeni RFU since 2002.

Career
Caucaunibuca played wing for the Fiji national team, and formerly played for New Zealand-based teams such as Super Rugby's Blues and provincial side Northland. He is also known as 'Caucau' . In his prime, he was generally regarded by both journalists and international players as the greatest attacking player in world rugby.

He burst onto the international scene with his performances in the 2003 Rugby World Cup, particularly against France and Scotland. Early in the second half against France, Caucaunibuca received a long cut-out pass just outside his own 22, and proceeded to run pass his opposite number Aurélien Rougerie as well as two covering defenders on his way to scoring under the posts. In Fiji's final Pool B match against Scotland, a match that would decide who would finish behind France in their pool, Caucaunibuca stole the show in the opening exchanges with two remarkable solo tries: one finishing from about 25 yards out down the left-hand touchline with a one-handed diving finish, the second once again starting from just outside his 22 and running the length of the field, easily evading tacklers to score.

In 2005, Caucaunibuca returned to Fiji from France in late May to prepare for games against New Zealand Māori and the All Blacks and in time for Fiji's World Cup qualifiers, but failed to appear in any of the June or July matches. He missed Fiji's first World Cup qualifying match against Tonga in Suva but was recalled for their subsequent match against Samoa. After assuring Fiji coach Wayne Pivac he would play, Caucaunibuca missed a flight to Samoa saying he had been forced to remain in Fiji with his wife who had an infected tooth. The Fiji Rugby Union banned him for one year, ruling him out of the 2005 autumn tour of Europe and the 2006 South Pacific Tri-Nations series.

In May 2006 his one-year ban was lifted after he showed remorse and a desire to play for Fiji. In his return match, he scored a try as Fiji lost to the Junior All Blacks, 35–17 in Suva. Later, in a mid-year Test against Six Nations participant Italy, he scored one of Fiji's four tries in a 29–18 win. When Caucau failed to arrive in France for Agen's preseason training camp in July 2006, it was widely rumoured that he had yet again displayed his past lack of discipline. However, Agen's management confirmed that he had contracted a tropical virus in Fiji and had been hospitalised there for several weeks. He was released in August, but lost 12 kg (27 lb) during his illness. Caucaunibuca did not make the return flight to France, as he had been told by his doctor that he could not travel abroad because of his sickness. During his recovery, he witnessed the birth of his daughter. Contrary to reports that he had decided to retire prematurely from rugby, he had also confirmed that he had spoken to his agent, who relayed the message to his Agen Club president that he would join them in the near future. Caucau would eventually be cleared for travel abroad, and would return to France that October. He made his comeback in Agen's first 2006–07 Heineken Cup fixture, a 19–17 home win over Edinburgh. Although he did not score, he was named man of the match.

Caucaunibuca has been described in the media as "one of the fastest and most flamboyant players in international rugby". Scotland international Chris Paterson said of Caucaunibuca that "when he is fit, [he] can be the world's best player" and that he "is the type who can win a game almost on his own." England international centre Mike Tindall describes him as "the best player I have ever played against." For the last two seasons in France, Caucaunibuca has been the league's top try scorer. In October 2006 he was awarded France's Player of the Year award.

He was named in the Pacific Islanders rugby union team for the 2006 tour of Europe. However he only played in the match against Scotland after missing the first game against Wales and losing his passport thus not making the last match of the series against Ireland. In the Islanders game against Scotland he scored one try and set up another one for Daniel Leo.

On 9 April 2007 it was announced that Caucaunibuca had incurred a 3-month ban after testing positive for cannabis use following Agen's Top 14 match against Montauban on 24 March. This followed a generally poor season for both club and player in which Caucaunibuca had scored a solitary try in 11 matches. Though the ban had ended, he was not picked up by Fiji to compete in the 2007 World Cup.

On 23 December 2007 he made his return for Agen scoring three tries in their 33–0 win over Toulon.

He left Agen following a number of injuries, being released by the club in February 2008. In July, he showed up for his local club, Tailevu in the Digicel Cup after being out of action for over 5 months. He has played 4 games to date for them, scoring 5 tries, which has boosted his career once again since he is currently receiving offers from the Guinness Premiership side Leicester Tigers. After failing to show up for trials for the Leicester Tigers, he joined the Fiji sevens training squad to prepare for the first leg of the season but after much deliberation by the Fiji Rugby Union, he was dropped from the training squad. A few days later, the sevens team coach, Waisale Serevi confirmed that Caucau has flown to France, back to his former club, Agen for another shot to revive his International career and Agen signed him on till the end of the season.

On 13 June 2009, Caucau announced that he would no longer make himself available for Tests with the Flying Fijians. He said getting drafted for Test duty only brought him "bad
luck." However, on 18 March 2010, he went back on that decision stating a desire to play at the 2011 Rugby World Cup.

He finished the 2009–10 Rugby Pro D2 season as the top try scorer with 13 tries as well as helping his side to qualify for the Top 14 next season after which he returned to Fiji to prepare for a one-off test against the Wallabies in Canberra on 5 June.

After failing to arrive in time to the club, he was fired and told to leave as the players and management no longer "trusted" him.

In October 2010, Caucau was recruited by the European champions, Stade Toulousain who signed him on as a "medical-joker" (replacement for injured centre Yann David). The move was facilitated by Toulouse's Fijian wing, Vilimoni Delasau. 

In 2010, he was selected in the French Barbarians squad to play Tonga on 26 November.

In March 2013 Caucau rejoined Northland with aspirations of playing Super Rugby again. He had been playing in the Northland club competition and was named in the Classic All Blacks side to take on his home team, Fiji in their Centenary celebrations on 12 June.

In November 2014, Caucau announced his desire to play for the Fiji Sevens team format for the 2016 Olympics. He left Agen in November 2014 and took up a contract with Army SC to play in the Sri Lankan Rugby League. This did not last long and he returned to his remote Fijian village.

In 2019 during an interview for the documentary Oceans Apart, Caucau revealed he had been living destitute and penniless in his remote Fijian village since finishing up his rugby career with Agen in 2014. Caucua had spent most of his money on alcohol and handouts to friends and family and in his words 'had nothing left'.

International statistics

Club statistics

Honours

Personal
Top 14 top try scorer: (2005–06)

Playing style
Caucaunibuca's speed, weight, strength and low centre of gravity have often led to him scoring fantastic tries. In recent years, however, his ever-increasing weight has prompted a move from wing to centre, and although he is still a prolific try scorer, his tries are no longer in the same vein as those for which he originally shot to fame. Although his career span for just few a years he is still regarded as one of the best wingers by rugby pundits from all over the world.

See also
 List of sportspeople sanctioned for doping offences

References

External links
 
 
 
 
 
 Video of Caucaunibuca's 2003 World Cup try for Fiji against France
 Profile @ Stade Toulouse

1980 births
Fijian rugby union players
Living people
Rugby union centres
Rugby union wings
Doping cases in rugby union
Blues (Super Rugby) players
Northland rugby union players
Fiji international rugby union players
Pacific Islanders rugby union players
SU Agen Lot-et-Garonne players
Stade Toulousain players
Fijian expatriate rugby union players
Expatriate rugby union players in New Zealand
Fijian expatriate sportspeople in New Zealand
Fiji international rugby sevens players
Male rugby sevens players
I-Taukei Fijian people
People from Bua Province
Commonwealth Games medallists in rugby sevens
Commonwealth Games silver medallists for Fiji
Commonwealth Games rugby sevens players of Fiji
Rugby sevens players at the 2002 Commonwealth Games
Medallists at the 2002 Commonwealth Games